Dick Stockton was the defending champion of the singles event at the ABN World Tennis Tournament, but lost in the quarterfinals to first-seeded Jimmy Connors who won the title after a victory in the final against fourth-seeded Raúl Ramírez 7–5, 7–5.

Seeds

Draw

Finals

Upper half

Lower half

References

External links
 International Tennis Federation (ITF) tournament details

1978 ABN World Tennis Tournament